The Remote Viewer is an album by Coil. The three-track album was released in May 2002 in an edition of 500 copies. The album was later re-edited by Peter Christopherson and expanded to include a second CD of two new tracks. The second edition was released in August 2006 on the same day as the expanded version of Black Antlers. Both reissues were mastered by Mark Godwin and printed in Thailand. Although the original edition did not include a catalog number, the reissue was given a catalog number of THBKK1. Both reissues are currently available at the official Coil website.

Track listing

1st edition
 "Remote Viewing 1" – 19:31
 "Remote Viewing 2" – 7:59
 "Remote Viewing 3" – 21:13

2nd edition
"Disc 1":
 "Remote Viewing 1" – 19:33
 "Remote Viewing 2" – 7:57
 "Remote Viewing 3" - 21:13

"Disc 2":
 "Remote Viewing 4" – 9:53
 "Remote Viewing 5" – 9:26

References

External links
 
 
 The Remote Viewer at Brainwashed

2002 albums
Coil (band) albums